Roger Quenolle (19 July 1925 – 13 July 2004) was a French professional footballer who played as a striker.

During his career, he played for RC Paris, Rouen, Strasbourg, Red Star, and Stade Saint-Germain. He was capped twice for France. Quenolle later coached Stade Saint-Germain and Poissy.

Honours

Player 
RC Paris

 Coupe de France: 1948–49; runner-up: 1949–50

Manager 
Poissy

 French Division 3:

Notes

References

External links
 
 
 Biography

1925 births
2004 deaths
People from Le Vésinet
French footballers
France international footballers
Racing Club de France Football players
FC Rouen players
RC Strasbourg Alsace players
Red Star F.C. players
Stade Saint-Germain players
Ligue 1 players
Ligue 2 players
French football managers
Paris Saint-Germain F.C. managers
Association football forwards
Footballers from Yvelines
Championnat de France Amateur (1935–1971) players